Duarte, Duke of Guimarães (March 1541, in Almeirim – 28 November 1576, in Évora) was a Portuguese infante (prince), son of Duarte of Portugal, 4th Duke of Guimarães and his wife, Isabel of Braganza. He served as Constable of the Kingdom, the highest military authority in the Portuguese Empire, second only to the monarch.

Early life

Through his father, he was a grandson of King Manuel I of Portugal; through his mother, he was a grandson of James, 4th Duke of Braganza.

He was born posthumously and he inherited his father's titles and estates: the Dukedom of Guimarães. He was one of the most influential nobles during the reigns of Kings John III and Sebastian.

Political career
As member of the State Council he voted, in 1569, for the marriage of King Sebastian to Margaret of Valois (who later became Henry IV's first wife) and, in 1574, he escorted King Sebastian in his first trip to Tangiers, in north Africa.

In 1557, when King John III died, Duarte was one of the three legitimate surviving male descendants of King Manuel I of Portugal (together with King Sebastian and Cardinal-Infante Henry).

Personal life
King Sebastian was jealous of this and several times showed disrespect for Duarte's rank. When the King didn't invite Duarte to a royal bullfight, in Xabregas (Lisbon), Duarte was quite upset and, finally, he retired to Évora where, some months later, he died single and without issue.

Duarte had two sisters, both married to remarkable Renaissance princes:
Infanta Maria of Guimarães (1538–1577), also known as Maria de Portugal, married to the Italian prince Alessandro Farnese, Duke of Parma and Piacenza;
Infanta Catherine of Guimarães (1540–1614), also known as Catarina de Portugal, married to the Portuguese prince John, 6th Duke of Braganza.

Once she was married to a Portuguese, Infanta Catherine of Guimarães inherited her brother estates and rights to the Dukedom of Guimarães. During the 1580 Portuguese succession crisis, Catherine and her husband, John I of Braganza, were important claimants to the Portuguese throne.

Ancestry

See also
Duke of Guimarães
List of Portuguese Dukedoms

References

External links
 Genealogy of Infante Duarte II, 5th Duke of Guimarães, in Portuguese

Bibliography
"Nobreza de Portugal e do Brasil" – Vol. II, page 651. Published by Zairol Lda., Lisbon 1989.

Portuguese infantes
House of Aviz
1541 births
1576 deaths
105
16th-century Portuguese people
Constables of Portugal
People from Almeirim